Herbert Norville (born 1957 in London) is an actor known for his appearances in many British films in the 70s and 80s such as Scum (1979), Pressure (1976), Meantime (1983), Full Metal Jacket (1987) and Bugsy Malone (1976).

Partial filmography
 Smudger (1972) - Borstal Boy 
 Rumpole and the Confession of Guilt (1975) - Ossie Gladstone
 Bugsy Malone (1976) - Sarsaparilla Man
 Special Offer (1976) - Mickey
 Pressure (1976) - Anthony Watson
 The Boys and Mrs B (1977) - Nick
 Dinner at the Sporting Club (1978 BBC television play) - Elwyn
 Scum (1979) - Toyne
 Probation (1982 short film) - Arbley
 Meantime (1983) - Man in pub
 The Chain (1984) - Des
 Full Metal Jacket (1987) - Daytona Dave
 Wall of Tyranny (1988 TV Movie) - PFC Mason
 The Firm (1989 TV Movie) - Joe

References

External links
 
 

1967 births
Living people
Black British male actors
20th-century English male actors
Date of birth missing (living people)